Pannawa Muslim Central College (Tamil: பண்ணவா முஸ்லிம் மத்திய கல்லுரி), is a government school in Pannawa, Sri Lanka. It is one of Kurunegala's oldest schools, established in 1959. It is a Central College and currently has 600 students. The term "Pannawans" (Tamil:பன்னவன்ஸ்) is used to describe former and present pupils of the college.

References

Schools in Kurunegala District